Moxahala may refer to:

 Moxahala, Ohio, unincorporated community in Ohio, United States
 Moxahala Park, Ohio, unincorporated community in Ohio, United States
 Moxahala Creek, a tributary of the Muskingum River, in southeastern Ohio in the United States